Allia is a small river in Lazio, Italy. The Allia's source is located in the mountains near the location of Crustumerium and it flows near Monterotondo towards the Tiber.

The confluence of Allia and the Tiber is the site of the Battle of the Allia, where Romans were defeated by the Gallic tribe Senones under Brennus in 387 BC.

See also

References

Rivers of Italy
Rivers of Lazio
Rivers of the Province of Rome